Ante Žaja (born 18 November 1941) is a retired Croatian footballer.

Career
Žaja began playing football in his home town of Šibenik with the club HNK Šibenik in 1957.
In 1961, he moved to Hajduk Split, where he won the Yugoslav Cup in 1966-67.
It is considered a legend of Šibenik and Hajduk Split. 

In 2001 he won the "Matija Ljubek" career Award from the Croatian Olympic Committee.

Honours

Player
Hajduk Split 
 Yugoslav Cup: 1966–67

References

External links
 

1941 births
Living people
Sportspeople from Šibenik
Association football defenders
Yugoslav footballers
HNK Šibenik players
HNK Hajduk Split players
NK Zagreb players
Yugoslav First League players